Mount Longdon is a mountain in the east of East Falkland in the Falkland Islands. It is best known as the site of the Battle of Mount Longdon, and overlooks Stanley, the islands' capital.

References

Longdon